Cody Renard Richard (born May 1, 1988) is an American stage manager, producer, and educator in film and theatre. His career spans theatre, television, and opera including Broadway, Cirque du Soleil, and live televised events like the MTV VMAs and Annie! Live. He is an adjunct professor of stage management at Columbia University.

Cody was born and raised near Houston, Texas. He competed in rodeo events before pursuing a career in theatre. Cody studied theatre at Webster University's Conservatory of Theatre Arts in St. Louis where he graduated with a Bachelor of Fine Arts.

Career

Scholarship 
In response to the cultural and political events of 2020, Cody Renard Richard established the Cody Renard Richard Scholarship to encourage more Black, Asian, Latinx, Indigenous, and other students of color to pursue careers in theatrical management and artistic fields. The scholarship is designed to provide a space for the next generation of BIPOC artists to cultivate their leadership skills in relation to the theatrical industry.

The scholarship is created and managed in collaboration with the Broadway Advocacy Coalition.

Stage Management Credits

Broadway

Production Stage Manager 

 Freestyle Love Supreme
 Pass Over

Assistant Stage Manager 

 Dear Evan Hansen
 Hamilton
 If/Then
 After Midnight
 Motown The Musical
 Kinky Boots
 Ghost The Musical
 Lysistrata Jones
 The Lion King

References 

Living people
Broadway theatre people
Stage managers
1988 births